William Darrell "Bill" Lindsey (born Armstrong; March 18, 1935 – April 17, 2001), also known as Crazy Bill, was an American serial killer who murdered six prostitutes in St. Augustine, Florida, between 1988 and 1995. He was arrested shortly after he murdered a seventh prostitute in North Carolina, and, as part of a plea deal, he pleaded guilty to six of the murders and received a 30-year sentence in Florida. On April 17, 2001, he died of cancer whilst imprisoned.

Early life 

William Darrell Lindsey was born William Armstrong Jr. in Palatka on March 18, 1935, the only child of William, a roofer, and Mabel Armstrong, a homemaker. On August 18, 1935, when Lindsey was five-months-old, he was in the car with his parents when, for unknown reasons, the car swerved off the road and crashed. William and Mabel, in the front and passenger seats, died on impact. Lindsey, found wedged between the front and backseats, only sustained minor scratches and bruises.

A local couple from St. Augustine, Cecil and Olean Lindsey,  who had recently experienced the loss of their infant son, adopted William. Besides William, the Lindseys' had three other children, two older daughters and a son. Cecil, his adoptive father, was a well-liked man who worked multiple jobs, his favorite being an actor for a local town attraction. Olean, his adoptive mother, was a nurse. Olean, a religious woman, was physically and emotionally abusive to her children. She viewed what was typically considered regular mischievousness as sinful, and felt it was her duty to punish those who perpetrated these actions. She frequently beat her children with frying pans and leather straps, pulled their hair, pinched them, and berated them. Cecil was submissive to his wife, allowing her to discipline their children and control all other household matters while he focused on work and other community events.

During his childhood, William tortured multiple cats, killing one. He also set a hut on fire that other boys in his neighborhood had built. In school, he was described as a c-grade student with low intelligence. He had been held back several times, reaching grade 12 at age 21. A small, meek child, he was bullied by classmates and other children in his neighborhood. Lindsey had no close friends and did not participate in any extracurricular activities. He did, however, have a job as a busboy at a local restaurant.

Victims

Arrest and legal proceedings 
Lindsey was arrested for Lucy Raymer's murder after a taxi driver witnessed her going into Lindsey's trailer on the night of her murder. Detectives soon linked him to the Florida murders as well, and Lindsey made a full confession.

On May 21, 1999, he pleaded guilty to four counts of second-degree murder in the cases of Anita Stevens, Constance Terrell, Lashawna Street, and Cheryl Lucas. On July 8 of that year, he pleaded guilty to the two remaining murders – those of Donetha Snead-Haile and Diana Richardson. He was sentenced to 30 years imprisonment.

Death 
On April 17, 2001, Lindsey died from cancer whilst imprisoned at the Marion Correctional Institute in Ocala, Florida.

In media 
Season five, episode eight of Investigation Discovery's ‘Evil Lives Here, titled, "I Hate Being Daddy's Girl," is about the childhood of Robin Lindsey, one of Lindsey's daughters.

Notes

References

Bibliography 

 

1935 births
2001 deaths
American serial killers
Male serial killers
American male criminals
American people convicted of murder
American people who died in prison custody
20th-century American criminals
Crimes against sex workers in the United States
Florida National Guard personnel
People from Palatka, Florida
People convicted of murder by Florida
Prisoners who died in Florida detention
Criminals from Florida